Patriarch Dositheos may refer to:

 Patriarch Dositheos I of Jerusalem, Greek Orthodox Patriarch of Jerusalem in  1190–1191
 Patriarch Dositheos II of Jerusalem, Greek Orthodox Patriarch of Jerusalem in 1669–1707